Weirs is the first collaborative studio album by Luke Vibert and Jeremy Simmonds released in 1993.

Track listing

References

External links
 

1993 albums
Luke Vibert albums
Rephlex Records albums